The 2000 Rugby League World Cup was the twelfth staging of the Rugby League World Cup. It was held in the United Kingdom, Ireland, and France, and took place between 28 October and 25 November 2000. Sixteen national teams competed in four groups of four, playing each other once over three weekly rounds before a series of play-offs that culminated in the final between Australia and New Zealand. Tournament favourites Australia defeated New Zealand in the final, claiming their sixth consecutive and ninth total Rugby League World Cup title. Australian winger Wendell Sailor was named player of the tournament.

Summary
Building on the 1995 Rugby League World Cup, it was decided to expand the format further, with the number of teams rising from 10 to 16. As before, an Emerging Nations Tournament was held alongside the main event.

The millennium World Cup attracted a record sponsorship of over £1 million from Lincoln Financial Group, who had also sponsored Great Britain's Tests against New Zealand the previous autumn.

The 2000 World Cup was not considered a great success. There were too many mismatches in the early stages, and some of the teams lacked credibility. Notably the inclusion of a side representing New Zealand's Māori population, Aotearoa Māori, alongside the full New Zealand team, and a Lebanon side consisting entirely of Australians of Lebanese origin, led to derisory comments in the media. The tournament's organisers also attracted criticism regarding marketing and ticketing. For these reasons crowds at the tournament were low; also torrential rainstorms and the crisis on Britain's railways following the Hatfield rail crash did not help encourage spectators.

There were however some positives: the tournament returned a profit of more than £2 million despite the small crowds it attracted; the French performed creditably, and attendance for the games held in France was encouraging. The much-derided Lebanon team also proved the catalyst for domestic competition in that country.

On the competition side of things, favourites Australia and New Zealand cut a swathe through the tournament, with several dominant performances setting up an obvious final clash. New Zealand's 49–6 semi-final dispatch of England, coupled with Australia only hitting the lead in their semi-final against Wales with 23 minutes remaining, had New Zealand installed as favourites in some quarters. However, it was Australia who prevailed in a tense, absorbing finale. Australia only led 18–12 with 15 minutes remaining, but a glut of possession saw them finish strongly – scoring four late tries to give the appearance of an easy victory.

Qualifying

Lebanon defeated the United States 62–8 in the final play-off match.

Teams

The 2000 World Cup tournament features 16 teams:
  – coached by Chris Anderson and captained by Brad Fittler
  – coached by Stan Martin and captained by Kevin Iro
  – coached by John Kear and captained by Andy Farrell
  – coached by Don Furner and captained by Lote Tuqiri
  – coached by Gilles Dumas and captained by Fabien Devecchi
  – coached by Steve O'Neill and Andy Kelly and captained by Terry O'Connor
  – coached by John Elias and captained by Darren Marroon
  – coached by Frank Endacott and captained by Richie Barnett
  – coached by Cameron Bell and captained by Tawera Nikau
  – coached by Bob Bennett and captained by Adrian Lam
  – coached by Evgeniy Klebanov and captained by Ian Rubin
  – coached by Darrell Williams and captained by Willie Poching
  – coached by Shaun McRae and captained by Danny Russell
  – coached by Paul Matete and captained by Jamie Bloem
  – coached by Murray Hurst and captained by Martin Masella
  – coached by Clive Griffiths and captained by Iestyn Harris

Venues 
The games were played at various venues in England, Wales, Scotland, Ireland, France.

The Twickenham Stadium in London, the home of the English rugby union was the host stadium for the opening ceremony and match featuring hosts England and defending champions Australia.

Group stage

Group A

Group B

Group C

Group D

Knockout stage 

The top 2 teams from each pool advanced to the quarter-finals.

Quarter-finals

Semi-finals

Final

Try scorers 
10
  Wendell Sailor

9
  Lesley Vainikolo

6
  Ryan Girdler
  Jamie Peacock
  Richie Barnett
  Willie Talau

5
  Bryan Fletcher
  Adam MacDougall
  Robbie Paul

4

  Trent Barrett
  Brad Fittler
  Matthew Gidley
  Nathan Hindmarsh
  Mat Rogers
  Lote Tuqiri
  Pascal Jampy
  Tonie Carroll
  Brian Leauma
  Tevita Vaikona
  Lee Briers
  Kris Tassell

3

  Andrew Johns
  Ben Kennedy
  Darren Lockyer
  Kevin Sinfield
  Tony Smith
  Atunasia Vunivialu
  Claude Sirvent
  Michael Withers
  Hazem El Masri
  Hassan Saleh
  Nigel Vagana
  Ruben Wiki
  Shane Laloata
  Laloa Milford
  Fifita Moala

2

  Jason Croker
  Scott Hill
  Steve Berryman
  Andy Hay
  Sean Long
  Darren Rogers
  Paul Rowley
  Chev Walker
  Paul Wellens
  Frédéric Banquet
  Jean-Emmanuel Cassin
  Rachid Hechiche
  Brian Carney
  Ryan Sheridan
  Brian Jellick
  Stacey Jones
  Stephen Kearney
  Ali Lauiti'iti
  Tasesa Lavea
  Quentin Pongia
  Logan Swann
  David Vaealiki
  Boycie Nelson
  Clinton Toopi
  David Buko
  Stanley Gene
  John Wilshere
  Henry Fa'afili
  David Solomona
  Duane Mann
  Willie Mason
  Iestyn Harris
  Wes Davies

1

  Craig Gower
  Brett Kimmorley
  Gordon Tallis
  Shane Webcke
  Kevin Iro
  Leroy Joe
  Meti Noovao
  Karl Temata
  Tiri Toa
  Paul Deacon
  Andy Farrell
  Scott Naylor
  Leon Pryce
  Kris Radlinski
  Keith Senior
  Francis Stephenson
  Patrice Benausse
  Yacine Dekkiche
  Arnaud Dulac
  Jean-Marc Garcia
  Jérôme Guisset
  Julien Rinaldi
  Gael Tallec
  Tabua Cakacaka
  Jone Kuraduadua
  Eparama Navale
  Waisale Sovatabua
  David Barnhill
  Martin Crompton
  Michael Eagar
  Mark Forster
  Chris Joynt
  Tommy Martyn
  Steve Prescott
  Luke Ricketson
  Michael Coorey
  Travis Touma
  Richie Blackmore
  Nathan Cayless
  Henry Paul
  Tony Puletua
  Matt Rua
  Craig Smith
  David Kidwell
  Wairangi Koopu
  Steve Matthews
  Paul Rauhihi
  Hare Te Rangi
  Eddie Aila
  Marcus Bai
  Raymond Karl
  Alex Krewanty
  Adrian Lam
  Michael Mondo
  Elias Paiyo
  Lucas Solbat
  Matt Donovan
  Robert Ilyasov
  Joel Rullis
  Monty Betham
  Willie Swann
  Danny Arnold
  Geoff Bell
  David Maiden
  Lee Penny
  Scott Rhodes
  Adrian Vowles
  Daniel Foster
  Paul Fisiiahi
  David Fisiiahi
  Lipina Kaufusi
  Talite Liava'a
  Nelson Lomi
  Esau Mann
  Martin Masella
  Willie Wolfgramm
  Leon Barnard
  Brian Best
  Coenraad Breytenbach
  Quinton De Villiers
  Paul Atcheson
  Jason Critchley
  Keiron Cunningham
  Anthony Farrell
  Mick Jenkins
  Paul Sterling
  Ian Watson

References

External links 
 2000 World Cup Final at bbc.co.uk
 2000 World Cup at rlhalloffame.org.uk
 2000 World Cup at rlwc2008.com
 2000 World Cup at rugbyleagueproject.org
 2000 World Cup at 188-rugby-league.co.uk